Dušan Zaťko is a former Czechoslovak slalom canoeist who competed in the 1980s.

He won a gold medal in the C2 team event at the 1983 ICF Canoe Slalom World Championships in Meran.

References
Overview of athlete's results at CanoeSlalom.net

Czechoslovak male canoeists
Living people
Year of birth missing (living people)
Medalists at the ICF Canoe Slalom World Championships